The 1997 Volvo PGA Championship was the 43rd edition of the Volvo PGA Championship, an annual professional golf tournament on the European Tour. It was held 23–26 May at the West Course of Wentworth Club in Virginia Water, Surrey, England, a suburb southwest of London.

Ian Woosnam won his second Volvo PGA Championship with a two stroke victory over Darren Clarke, Ernie Els and Nick Faldo.

Past champions in the field 
Thirteen former champions entered the tournament.

Made the cut

Missed the cut

Nationalities in the field

Round summaries

First round 
Friday, 23 May 1997

Second round 
Saturday, 24 May 1997

Third round 
Sunday, 25 May 1997

Final round 
Monday, 26 May 1997

References 

BMW PGA Championship
Golf tournaments in England
Volvo PGA Championship
Volvo PGA Championship
Volvo PGA Championship